Patrick Long is a race car driver.

Patrick Long may also refer to:

Patrick James Long (1864-1934), American businessman and politician
Patrick Long, High Sheriff of Limerick City
Patrick Long, character in Alice Upside Down